Rey Pila is a Mexican rock band formed in Mexico City in 2010. The band consists of Diego Solórzano, Andrés Velasco, Rodrigo Blanco and Miguel Hernández, though it started as Solórzano's solo project. The name "Rey Pila" is Spanish for "King Battery", a phrase Diego saw in a painting by the late graffiti artist Jean-Michel Basquiat.

History

Formation and debut album
Rey Pila was created as the solo project of Diego Solórzano, former frontman for Los Dynamite. After splitting from Los Dynamite in 2008, Diego immediately began work on material for his solo project. Rey Pila released their first self-titled album in 2010, which was recorded in New York and co-produced by Diego and Paul Mahajan. The album contains songs in both English and Spanish. Vice magazine said, "The record belongs in the long and storied lineage of Mexican garage bands, from the garden path acid rock of Los Ovnis to the Beatles-esque jams of Los Locos." Solórzano enlisted long-time friends Andrés Velasco, Rodrigo Blanco and Miguel Hernández to play the first album live, and they ended up as full-time members of the band. By the end of 2011, Rey Pila had formally become a quartet.

The Future Sugar
In 2012, the band entered DFA Studios in New York City to begin work on their second album with producer Chris Coady. With this new material, Rey Pila caught the attention of Julian Casablancas. Casablancas described how he first came across Rey Pila's music in an interview with NME:

Rey Pila signed to Julian Casablancas's label Cult Records, which released double-sided single "Alexander/Lady in Red" in October 2013. The band embarked on their first European tour at the end of 2013, opening for labelmate Albert Hammond Jr., and then supported Interpol on their 2014 North American tour.

In March 2015, Rey Pila announced their second studio album, The Future Sugar, which was originally set to be released on May 5 of that same year. Soon after, they released a new single "What a Nice Surprise", which Spin magazine described as "a glittering build-up of reverberating synths and ’80s-inspired guitar licks". The band then embarked on a US tour with The Rentals.

After hearing some new demos Rey Pila was working on, Julian Casablancas urged the band to add three of these new songs to the album, which he co-produced himself. The lengthy process delayed the record's release. "Fire Away", one of the new Julian Casablancas produced tracks, was released as a single on July 16, 2015, and the new release date for The Future Sugar was finally announced for September 25, 2015. Rey Pila then embarked on a tour with Brandon Flowers to support the release of the new album.

According to the band, the album title was inspired by a phrase from David Lynch's movie Wild at Heart. Noisey called Rey Pila's "most excellent new album's" sound as "a little new wave, a little Cars, a little bit of a Bowie quaver, a pinch of Q Lazzarus, a lot of switchblade cool".

On May 31, 2016, Rey Pila premiered a new Warren Fu directed video for "Surveillance Camera", and that same night opened for their new labelmates The Strokes at the Capitol Theatre in Port Chester, NY.

Wall of Goth EP
At the end of 2016, Rey Pila entered Red Bull Studios in New York City to record new songs with Julian Casablancas and producer Shawn Everett. Those recordings made up Wall of Goth, a four-song EP that was released on April 28, 2017.

In October 2017, the band embarked on the “Hollywood Bolívar Tour”, their first South American tour, with labelmates The Voidz and Promiseland. Rey Pila closed out the year with a sold-out headline show in one of Mexico City’s most prestigious venues, El Plaza Condesa.

Some months later, in March 2018, Rey Pila released a cover of Siouxie and The Banshees's song, "Israel", and opened Depeche Mode's Global Spirit Tour Mexico City shows.

Velox Veritas
On August 21, 2020, the band released the album Velox Veritas.

Discography

Studio albums 
 Rey Pila (2010)
 The Future Sugar (2015)
 Velox Veritas (2020)

Singles & EPs 
"Alexander" (2013)
"What a Nice Surprise" (2015)
"Apex" (2015)
"Fire Away" (2015)
"Blast" (2016)
"Ninjas" (2017)
"How Do You Know?" (2017)
Wall of Goth EP (2017)
"Fangs" (2017)
"Israel" (2018)
Lucky No. 7 EP (2019)

Videography 
"No. 114" (April 2010, directed by Bang Buro)
"No Longer Fun" (July 2010, directed by Ariel Danziger and Alan Whitcher)
"Alexander" (April 2014, directed by Sammy Rawal)
"Fire Away" (December 2015, directed by Derrick Acosta & Dusty Peterman)
"Surveillance Camera" (May 2016, directed by Warren Fu)
"Ninjas" (May 2017, directed by Nina Ljeti)

References

External links 
 Official Website

Musical groups from Mexico City
Mexican alternative rock groups
Mexican indie rock groups
New wave groups
Musical groups established in 2010
2010 establishments in Mexico
Cult Records artists